Peter Gene Kelly (born June 3, 1956 in Fairbanks, Alaska) is an American politician who served as a member of the Alaska Senate. He also served as President of the Alaska State Senate from 2017 to 2019. Kelly previously served in the Alaska Legislature in the Alaska House of Representatives and Senate from 1995 until 2003. He was defeated for re-election in 2018, losing to state representative Scott Kawasaki.

Early life and education
Peter Gene Kelly was born in Fairbanks, Alaska on June 3, 1956, the youngest of seven children of Halford "Hal" and Helen Kelly.  He has lived in Fairbanks for most of his life, and graduated from Monroe Catholic High School in 1974.  His oldest brother was Mike Kelly. Mike died in a plane crash on December 7, 2016.

Kelly attended University of Alaska Fairbanks and earned his BS in business administration from Liberty University.

Career
In 1994, Kelly was unopposed in the House District 31 August 23, 1994 Republican primary, winning with 768 votes. He challenged incumbent Democratic Representative Joe Sitton in the general election. Kelly won the three-way November 8, 1994 general election with 2,269 votes (49.9%) against Sitton and Fairbanks Republican candidate Walt Johnson.

In 1996, Kelly was unopposed in the August 27, 1996 Republican primary. He won with 1,986 votes, and went on to win the November 5, 1996 general election with 3,262 votes (66.5%) against Democratic nominee Erik Holland.

In 1998, when Republican Senator Bert Sharp retired and left the District P seat open, Kelly won the August 25, 1998 Republican primary, receiving 2,107 votes against District 32 Representative Al Vezey. Kelly won the November 3, 1998 general election with 5,082 votes (61.80%) against Democratic nominee Jane Haigh.

Kelly was unopposed for the District B August 28, 2012 Republican primary, winning with 2,386 votes. He faced incumbent Democratic Senator Joe Paskvan (redistricted from District E) in the general election; Kelly won the November 6, 2012 contest with 6,232 votes (54.11%).

References

External links

 Official biography at the Alaska Legislature
 Official Alaska Senate Majority page
 Campaign site
 
 Pete Kelly at 100 Years of Alaska's Legislature

1956 births
21st-century American politicians
Republican Party Alaska state senators
Liberty University alumni
Living people
Republican Party members of the Alaska House of Representatives
Politicians from Fairbanks, Alaska
Presidents of the Alaska Senate
University of Alaska Fairbanks alumni